Tango is the first studio album by the American folk band Sonia & Disappear Fear, released on October 2, 2007 by Sonia's own Disappear Records label. The majority of the tracks are sung in Spanish with a few being sung in Hebrew, Arabic and English. Five of the tracks are translated versions of older songs: "Fallin'", "Be the One", "Sexual Telepathy", "Because We're Here" and "Millions of Rope".

Track listing

Personnel

Sonia & Disappear Fear
Sonia Rutstein (SONiA) - lead vocals, guitar
Laura Cerulli - percussionist, drums, backing vocals
John Grant - electric guitar, acoustic guitar, bass, programming
Christopher Sellman - bass

Additional personnel
Rabbi Elizabeth Bolton - vocals
Helen Hausmann - violin
Jared Denhard - tin whistle, flute
Brian Simms - piano

References

Disappear Fear albums
2007 albums
Self-released albums